The Lukh is a river in Ivanovo, Nizhny Novgorod and Vladimir Oblasts in Russia, a left tributary of the Klyazma (Volga's basin). The length of the river is 240 km. The area of its drainage basin is 4,450 km². The Lukh freezes up in late November and breaks up in April.

The main tributaries are Pechuga, Dobritsa, Landekh, Sezukh.

References 

Rivers of Ivanovo Oblast
Rivers of Vladimir Oblast
Rivers of Nizhny Novgorod Oblast